The Kingdom of Cilicia was an independent state that existed from 612 BC to 549 BC. The state was governed by the Syennesis dynasty, possibly from Greeks that moved into Cilicia towards the end of the Bronze Age. Prior to and after the independent kingdom, the Syennesis dynasty ruled Cilicia as autonomous state under the Neo-Assyrian Empire, Achaemenid Empire and the Kingdom of Alexander.

History
The Cilicians were able to protect themselves from Assyrian domination and with the dissolution of the Neo-Assyrian Empire in 612 BC, they managed to establish a fully independent kingdom. Due to having a significant strategical geography, the Cilicians were able to expand their kingdom to the Halys River in a short period. With these expansions, the Cilician Kingdom established itself as one of the strong powers of the time.

In 585 BC, Herodotus praised the Cilician king Syennesis I, the founder of the kingdom, for his efforts in leading negotiations ending the 5 years' war between Lydia and Median Kingdom.

War broke out between the two countries and continued for five years, during which both the Lydians and Medes won a number of victories. On one occasion they had an unexpected battle in the dark, an event which occurred after five years of indecisive warfare. The two armies had already engaged and the fight was in progress, when the day was suddenly turned into night. [...] Both Lydians and Medes broke off the engagement when they saw this darkening of the day; they were more anxious than they had been to conclude peace, and a reconciliation was brought about by Syennesis, a Cilician, and Labynetus of Babylon, who were the men responsible both for the pact to keep the peace and for the exchange of marriages between the two kingdoms. They persuaded Alyattes to give his daughter Aryenis to Astyages, son of Cyaxares - knowing that treaties seldom remain intact without powerful sanctions.

The peaceful governance conducted by the Syennesis dynasty allowed the kingdom survive, and Appuašu, the son of Syennessis, would go on to defend the country against the Babylonian king Neriglissar's campaign, whose army reached Cilicia and crossed the Taurus mountain range. The Achaemenids would go on to defeat Lydians, forcing Appuašu to recognize the authority of the Persians in 549 BC to keep the local administration in Cilicians hands. These events, occurring under the reign of Cyrus the Great, transformed Cilicia intp an autonomous satrapy.

The Cilicians were independent in their internal affairs and kept this autonomy for almost 150 years. In 401, Syennesis III and his wife Epyaxa supported the revolt of Cyrus the Younger against his brother Artaxerxes II Mnemon. This was sound policy, because otherwise, Cilicia would have been looted by the rebel army. However, after the defeat of Cyrus at Cunaxa, Syennesis' position was difficult. Most scholars assume that this behavior marked the end of the independence of Cilicia. After 400, it became a normal satrapy.

Government and military
Apart from the independent period between 612 to 549 BC, the Cilicians mostly had an autonomous governance under the protection of the Neo-Assyrian Empire, Achaemenid Empire and the Empire of Alexander. As a satrapy of the Achameneid Empire, the Cilicians were independent in their internal affairs. Achaemenid satrapies had to pay annual tax to the Persian Emperor. According to Herodotus, as the fourth satrapy in rank, Cilicia had to give 500 talent  silver (approx. 1.3 tonnes) and 360 white horses. Due their extended autonomy, Cilicians paid more tax than the other satrapies.

The Cilicians strengthened their navy during their time as a satrapy, having 600 ships when they were suppressing the Greek revolts on the western coasts of Asia Minor. Navy privates were mostly made up of Phoenicians, thus Cilicians and Cypriots were in high ranks in the Achaemenid Navy. Herodotus praised the naval skills of Cilicians in his writings.

Syennesis dynasty
Syennesis I: The founder of the kingdom
Appuašu or : Son of Syennesis I, king of Pirindu/Piriddu ("rough" Cilicia)
Oromedon: The father of Syennesis II
Syennesis II: The son of Oromedon and probably the grandson of Appuwašu. He is mentioned as one of the commanders in the Persian navy during Xerxes' invasion of Greece (480 BCE). He married his daughter to Pixodarus, a Carian leader.
Syennesis III: Probably the grandson of Syennesis II. He was married to Epyaxa.

References

Kingdom
Former countries in Western Asia
6th-century BC disestablishments
546 BC